Andrei Makarov or Andrey Makarov may refer to:

Andrei Makarov (ice hockey, born 1964), Russian ice hockey forward who played with  Ak Bars Kazan
Andrei Makarov (ice hockey, born 1966), Russian ice hockey forward who played with Metallurg Novokuznetsk
Andrey Makarov (ice hockey) (born 1993), Russian ice hockey goaltender
Andrey Makarov (racewalker) (born 1971), Belarusian race walker
Andrey Makarov (politician), Russian lawyer and politician
Andrey Makarov (weightlifter), Kazakhstani weightlifter

See also
 Makarov (surname)